Mongkolpetch Petchyindee Academy is a Thai Muay Thai fighter.

Biography and career
Mongkolpetch grew up in a family of farmers in Roi Et province. His older brother loved boxing since childhood and he often secretly followed him to practice. At 10 years old he had his first fight and received a purse he gave to his parents to support the family. He started his fighting career under the ring name Mongkoldetlek and represented the Panyawai camp until he was bought by the Kesa Gym camp for 200,000 baht in 2014. Mongkoldetlek had good results which led him to be fighting under the prestigious Kiatpetch promotion at Lumpinee Stadium.

The Kesa Gym camp had to close for financial reasons and Mongkoldetlek was signed by the Petchyindee Academy in 2018, he then changed his ring name to Mongkolpetch Petchyindee Academy.

On March 6, 2018 Mongkolpetch faced Muangthai PKSaenchaimuaythaigym at Lumpinee Stadium. He was defeated by decision.

Mongkolpetch faced Elias Mahmoudi in the main event of ONE Championship: Full Blast 2 on June 11, 2021. He won the fight by majority decision.

Mongkolpetch faced Jonathan Haggerty at ONE: Bad Blood on 11 February 2022. He lost the bout via unanimous decision.

Due to a disagreement between his gym, Petchyindee Academy, and ONE Championship, all Petchyindee fighters were released from the promotion at the request of the gym.

Titles and accomplishments
Lumpinee Stadium
 2017 Lumpinee Stadium 130 lbs Champion

Channel 7 Boxing Stadium
 2017 Channel 7 Stadium Fight of the Year (vs Nawaphol Lookpachrist)

Hilux Revo Muay Thai Marathon
 2018 Toyota Marathon Tournament 140 lbs Champion

Fight record

|-  style="background:#fbb;"
| 2022-12-02|| Loss ||align=left| Paidaeng Pakyok77 || Rajadamnern World Series + Petchyindee, Rajadamnern Stadium || Bangkok, Thailand || Decision (Unanimous) || 3 || 3:00 
|-  style="background:#fbb;"
| 2022-10-30|| Loss||align=left| Paidaeng Pakyok77 || Muaydee Vitheethai + Jitmuangnon, Or.Tor.Gor.3 Stadium || Nonthaburi, Thailand || Decision || 5 || 3:00
|-  style="background:#cfc;"
| 2022-09-18|| Win ||align=left| Duangsompong Jitmuangnon||  Suek Muay Thai Witee Tin Thai Muang Nam Dam || Kalasin province, Thailand ||Decision (Split)|| 5||3:00
|-  style="background:#cfc;"
| 2022-08-18 || Win||align=left| Petchsinin Chor.Thaiset ||Petchyindee, Rajadamnern Stadium || Bangkok, Thailand || Decision || 5 || 3:00
|-  style="background:#fbb;"
| 2022-06-12 || Loss||align=left| Paidaeng Paesaisee ||Muaydee VitheeThai + Jitmuangnon, Or.Tor.Gor3 Stadium || Nonthaburi province, Thailand || Decision || 5 || 3:00
|-  style="background:#cfc;"
| 2022-05-21|| Win||align=left| Pato Wor.Wangprom || Banchamek Gym Buakaw Village || Chiang Mai province, Thailand || Decision  || 5 || 3:00
|-  style="background:#fbb;"
| 2022-02-11|| Loss ||align=left| Jonathan Haggerty || ONE: Bad Blood || Singapore || Decision (Unanimous) || 3 || 3:00
|-  style="background:#fbb;"
| 2021-11-04|| Loss ||align=left| Flukenoi Kiatfahlikit || Petchyindee + Muay Thai Moradok Kon Thai || Buriram Province, Thailand || Decision || 5 || 3:00
|-  style="background:#cfc;"
| 2021-06-11|| Win ||align=left| Elias Mahmoudi ||  |ONE Championship: Full Blast 2 || Singapore || Decision (Majority) || 3 || 3:00
|-  style="background:#fbb;"
| 2021-04-09|| Loss ||align=left| Chorfah Tor.Sangtiennoi || Petchyindee Road Show || Songkhla, Thailand || Decision || 5 || 3:00
|-  style="background:#cfc;"
| 2021-03-13|| Win||align=left| Kaewkangwan Priwayo|| Majujaya Muay Thai, Temporary Outdoors Stadium || Pattani, Thailand ||Decision ||5 ||3:00
|-  style="background:#cfc;"
| 2020-07-31|| Win ||align=left| Sok Thy || ONE Championship: No Surrender 3 || Bangkok, Thailand || Decision (Unanimous) || 3 ||3:00
|-  style="background:#cfc;"
| 2020-02-28|| Win||align=left| Kaewkangwan Priwayo || Ruamponkonchon Pratan Super Fight || Pathum Thani, Thailand || Decision||5 ||3:00
|-  style="background:#c5d2ea;"
| 2020-01-31|| Draw ||align=left| Superball Tded99 || Phuket Super Fight Real Muay Thai || Mueang Phuket District, Thailand || Decision || 5||3:00
|-  style="background:#fbb;"
| 2019-11-21 || Loss ||align=left| Rungkit Wor.Sanprapai || Rajadamnern Stadium || Bangkok, Thailand || Decision || 5 || 3:00
|-  style="background:#cfc;"
| 2019-10-18 || Win ||align=left| Teeradet Chor.Hapayak || Lumpinee Stadium || Bangkok, Thailand || Decision || 5 || 3:00
|- style="background:#cfc;"
| 2019-09-06 || Win ||align=left| Joseph Lasiri || ONE Championship: Immortal Triumph || Ho Chi Minh City, Vietnam || Decision (Majority) || 3 || 3:00
|-  style="background:#cfc;"
| 2019-07-18 || Win ||align=left| Phet Utong Or. Kwanmuang || Rajadamnern Stadium || Bangkok, Thailand || Decision || 5 || 3:00
|-  style="background:#cfc;"
| 2019-04-24 || Win ||align=left| Petchngam Kiatkampon || Rajadamnern Stadium || Bangkok, Thailand || Decision || 5 || 3:00
|-  style="background:#cfc;"
| 2019-03-20 || Win ||align=left| Chanasuek Gor.Kampanat || Rajadamnern Stadium || Bangkok, Thailand || KO || 3 ||
|- style="background:#cfc;"
| 2019-01-19 || Win ||align=left| Alexi Serepisos || ONE Championship: Eternal Glory || Jakarta, Indonesia || Decision (Unanimous) || 3 || 3:00
|-  style="background:#cfc;"
| 2018-12-21 || Win ||align=left| Petchsongpak Sitcharoensap ||  True4U Muaymanwansuk Hilux Revo Marathon || Songkhla, Thailand || Decision || 5 || 3:00
|-  style="background:#fbb;"
| 2018-11-22 || Loss ||align=left| Dechsakda Phukongyadsuebudomsuk || Rajadamnern Stadium || Bangkok, Thailand || Decision || 5 || 3:00
|- style="background:#cfc;"
| 2018-10-19 || Win ||align=left| Tawanauek Sit-Or.Boonchob || Toyota Marathon, Final || Hat Yai, Thailand || Decision || 3 || 3:00 
|-
! style=background:white colspan=9 |
|- style="background:#cfc;"
| 2018-10-19 || Win ||align=left| Jamel Madani || Toyota Marathon, Semi Finals || Hat Yai, Thailand || Decision || 3 || 3:00
|- style="background:#cfc;"
| 2018-10-19 || Win ||align=left| Badr Elhamss || Toyota Marathon, Quarter Finals || Hat Yai, Thailand || KO || 2 ||
|-  style="background:#fbb;"
| 2018-09-13 || Loss ||align=left| Yamin PK.Saenchaimuaythaigym || Rajadamnern Stadium || Bangkok, Thailand || Decision || 5 || 3:00
|- style="background:#cfc;"
| 2018-07-06 || Win ||align=left| Yok Parunchai || RuamponkonSamui || Ko Samui, Thailand || Decision|| 5 || 3:00
|-  style="background:#fbb;"
| 2018-06-05|| Loss ||align=left| Suakim PK Saenchaimuaythaigym || Lumpinee Stadium || Bangkok, Thailand || Decision || 5 ||
|-  style="background:#fbb;"
| 2018-03-06 || Loss ||align=left| Muangthai PKSaenchaimuaythaigym || Lumpineekiatphet, Lumpinee Stadium || Bangkok, Thailand || Decision || 5 || 3:00
|- style="background:#cfc;"
| 2018-01-19 || Win ||align=left| Phetpabut Situbon ||  || Thailand || Decision|| 5 || 3:00
|- style="background:#cfc;"
| 2017-12-08 || Win ||align=left| Nawaphol Lookprachrist || Lumpinee Stadium || Bangkok, Thailand || Decision|| 5 || 3:00
|- style="background:#fbb;"
| 2017-11-14 || Loss ||align=left| Nawaphol Lookprachrist || Lumpinee Stadium || Bangkok, Thailand || Decision|| 5 || 3:00
|-
! style=background:white colspan=9 |
|- style="background:#fbb;"
| 2017-09-24 || Loss ||align=left| Nawaphol Lookprachrist ||  || Bangkok, Thailand || Decision|| 5 || 3:00
|- style="background:#cfc;"
| 2017-08-20 || Win ||align=left| Yok Parunchai || Channel 7 Boxing Stadium || Bangkok, Thailand || Decision|| 5 || 3:00
|-  style="background:#fbb;"
| 2017-07-14|| Loss ||align=left| Suakim PK Saenchaimuaythaigym ||  || Koh Samui, Thailand || KO || 4 ||
|- style="background:#cfc;"
| 2017-06-09 || Win ||align=left| Suakim PK Saenchaimuaythaigym|| Lumpinee Stadium || Bangkok, Thailand || Decision|| 5 || 3:00
|-
! style=background:white colspan=9 |
|- style="background:#cfc;"
| 2017-03-05 || Win ||align=left| Nawaphol Lookprachrist || Channel 7 Boxing Stadium || Thailand || Decision|| 5 || 3:00
|- style="background:#cfc;"
| 2017-02-07 || Win ||align=left| Sakchainoy MU-Den|| Lumpinee Stadium || Bangkok, Thailand || Decision|| 5 || 3:00
|- style="background:#cfc;"
| 2017-01-10 || Win ||align=left| Palaphol Sor.Tor Yiaobangsaen|| Lumpinee Stadium || Bangkok, Thailand || Decision|| 5 || 3:00
|- style="background:#cfc;"
| 2016-12-09 || Win ||align=left| Saen Parunchai|| Lumpinee Stadium || Bangkok, Thailand || Decision|| 5 || 3:00
|- style="background:#fbb;"
| 2016-10-04 || Loss ||align=left| Phetmorakot Teeded99|| Lumpinee Stadium || Bangkok, Thailand || Decision|| 5 || 3:00
|- style="background:#fbb;"
| 2016-09-02 || Loss ||align=left| Phetmorakot Teeded99|| Lumpinee Stadium || Bangkok, Thailand || Decision|| 5 || 3:00
|- style="background:#cfc;"
| 2016-07-12 || Win||align=left| Sirimongkol PK.SaenchaiMuayThaiGym|| Lumpinee Stadium || Bangkok, Thailand || Decision|| 5 || 3:00
|- style="background:#fbb;"
| 2016-06-28 || Loss||align=left| Nawaphol Lookprachrist || Channel 7 Boxing Stadium || Thailand || Decision|| 5 || 3:00
|- style="background:#c5d2ea;"
| 2016-06-19 || Draw||align=left| Nawaphol Lookprachrist || Channel 7 Boxing Stadium || Thailand || Decision|| 5 || 3:00
|- style="background:#cfc;"
| 2016-05-08 || Win||align=left| Yodtongthai Sor.Sommai || Channel 7 Boxing Stadium || Thailand || Decision|| 5 || 3:00
|- style="background:#cfc;"
| 2016-03-15 || Win||align=left| Yuthakan Phet-Por.Tor.Or.|| Lumpinee Stadium || Bangkok, Thailand || Decision|| 5 || 3:00
|- style="background:#fbb;"
| 2016-02-21 || Loss||align=left| Yuthakan Phet-Por.Tor.Or.|| Rangsit Stadium || Thailand || Decision || 5 || 3:00
|- style="background:#cfc;"
| 2016-01-31 || Win||align=left| Rungpet Kiatjaroenchai || Rangsit Boxing Stadium || Thailand || KO || 1 ||
|- style="background:#cfc;"
| 2016-01-03 || Win||align=left| Petchtaksin Sor.Sommai|| Channel 7 Boxing Stadium || Thailand ||Decision|| 5 || 3:00
|- style="background:#cfc;"
| 2015-12-06 || Win||align=left| Payakdam Extracolefilm|| Rajadamnern Stadium || Bangkok, Thailand ||Decision|| 5 || 3:00
|- style="background:#cfc;"
| 2015-11-25 || Win||align=left| Phetsusan MU-Den|| Rajadamnern Stadium || Bangkok, Thailand || KO || 1||
|- style="background:#cfc;"
| 2015-10-25 || Win||align=left| Densiam Sakvichian|| Jitmuangnon Boxing Stadium || Thailand || Decision|| 5 || 3:00
|- style="background:#cfc;"
| 2015-09-06 || Win||align=left| Nongbee Sitsarawatjiraphong||Rajadamnern Stadium || Bangkok, Thailand || Decision|| 5 || 3:00
|- style="background:#fbb;"
| 2015-01-31 || Loss ||align=left| Palaphol Sor.Tor Yiaobangsaen|| Lumpinee Stadium || Bangkok, Thailand || Decision|| 5 || 3:00
|- style="background:#cfc;"
| 2014-11-23 || Win||align=left| Nongbee Sitsarawatjiraphong|| Jitmuangnon Boxing Stadium || Thailand || Decision|| 5 || 3:00
|- style="background:#fbb;"
| 2014-09-24 || Loss ||align=left| Phetmuangchon Sudsakorn MuayThaiGym|| Lumpinee Stadium || Bangkok, Thailand || TKO|| 3 ||
|- style="background:#cfc;"
| 2014-09-19 || Win ||align=left| Kunkrai Parunchai|| Lumpinee Stadium || Bangkok, Thailand || TKO|| 3 || 
|-
| colspan=9 | Legend:

References

1994 births
Mongkolpetch Petchyindee Academy
Living people
Mongkolpetch Petchyindee Academy
ONE Championship kickboxers